Dumitru Braşoveanu is a Moldovan politician.

Biography 

He served as member of the Parliament of Moldova.

External links 
 Cine au fost şi ce fac deputaţii primului Parlament din R. Moldova (1990-1994)?
 Declaraţia deputaţilor din primul Parlament
 Site-ul Parlamentului Republicii Moldova

References

Living people
Moldovan MPs 1990–1994
Popular Front of Moldova MPs
Year of birth missing (living people)